Jakub Skierka (born 4 October 1998) is a Polish swimmer. He competed in the men's 200 meter backstroke event at the 2017 World Aquatics Championships.

References

External links

1998 births
Living people
Polish male backstroke swimmers
Place of birth missing (living people)
Swimmers at the 2015 European Games
European Games medalists in swimming
European Games bronze medalists for Poland
Swimmers at the 2020 Summer Olympics
Olympic swimmers of Poland
21st-century Polish people